Darreh Beyglu (also Romanized as Darreh Beyglū) is a village in Arshaq-e Shomali Rural District, Arshaq District, Meshgin Shahr County, Ardabil Province, Iran. At the 2006 census, its population was 175, in 34 families.

References 

Towns and villages in Meshgin Shahr County